The Christian Liberation Movement ( or simply MCL) is a Cuban dissident party advocating political change in Cuba. MCL was founded in 1987 by a group of secular Catholics belonging to the Parish of Cerro, in Havana. From the movement's founding and until his death, it was led by Oswaldo Payá.  At present (2018), it is led by Eduardo Cardet. 

MCL has urged the governments, parliaments, citizens of the European Union to support "in a public and sustained manner the release of those jailed in Cuba for defending, promoting and exercising peacefully their human rights; the dialogue between Cubans as a path toward achieving the changes the Cuban people desire and national reconciliation; and our demands for changes in the laws so that the civil, political, economic, social and cultural rights of all Cubans are respected".

The Christian Liberation Movement is a member of the Centrist Democrat International, the international organization promoting Christian democracy.

See also

Varela Project
Christian democracy

References

External links
 Statement by the Christian Liberation Movement
 http://www.catholicnewsagency.com/news/political_prisoners_in_cuba_suffering_same_fate_as_mandela_reveal_dissidents/
 https://www.aciprensa.com/noticias/cuba-nombran-a-eduardo-cardet-como-coordinador-nacional-del-mcl-30996/
 https://www.aciprensa.com/noticias/cuba-nombran-a-eduardo-cardet-como-coordinador-nacional-del-mcl-30996/

 Political parties established in 1988
 Catholic political parties
 Christian democratic parties in North America
Political parties in Cuba
Opposition to Fidel Castro
 Human rights organizations based in Cuba